Richard Cardmaker (fl. 1376–1399) was an English politician.

Career
Cardmaker was the Mayor of Devizes in 1376–7, 1379–81 and 1391–2.

He was Member of Parliament for Devizes October 1383, November 1384, February 1388, September 1388, 1395 and 1399.

References

Year of birth missing
Year of death missing
English MPs October 1383
English MPs November 1384
English MPs February 1388
English MPs September 1388
English MPs 1395
English MPs 1399
14th-century English politicians
14th-century births
Mayors of Devizes